Plectranthus fruticosus, the forest spurflower, is a species of flowering plant in the mint family Lamiaceae, native to South Africa.

The Latin specific epithet fruticosus means “shrubby”.

This plant is found throughout the Western Cape and Limpopo regions, enjoying the moist conditions and dappled shade of forest margins.

It has a long history of cultivation in Europe, where it requires protection from freezing temperatures. Several cultivars are available, of which the pink-flowered ‘James’ has won the Royal Horticultural Society’s Award of Garden Merit.

References

Flora of the Cape Provinces
fruticosus